Diederich is both a German surname and a masculine German given name. Notable people with the name include:

Surname
Benjamin W. Diederich (1903–1974), American politician
Bernard Diederich (1926–2020) American author, journalist and historian
Bim Diederich (1922–2012), Luxembourgish cyclist
François Diederich (1952–2020), Luxembourgish chemist
Jason Diederich, Australian Paralympic swimmer
Theresa Diederich (born 1992), American women's soccer player

Given name
Diederich Hinrichsen (born 1939), German mathematician
Diederich Krug (1821–1880), German classical pianist and composer

See also
Diederich College of Communication, primary college at Marquette University in Milwaukee, Wisconsin
Diederichs
Dietrich
Diedrich
Dieterich

German-language surnames
German masculine given names